Ballytrustan is a civil parish and townland (of 222 acres) in County Down, Northern Ireland. It is situated in the historic barony of Ards Upper.

Townlands
Ballytrustan civil parish contains the following townlands:

Ballybranigan
Ballyfounder
Ballymacnamee
Ballynichol
Ballytrustan
Ballywierd
Corrogs
Kearny
Parson Hall

See also
List of civil parishes of County Down

References